The 1924–25 SK Rapid Wien season was the 27th season in club history.

Squad

Squad and statistics

Squad statistics

Fixtures and results

League

Cup

References

1924-25 Rapid Wien Season
Rapid